Hypagyrtis esther, the esther moth, is a moth of the family Geometridae. It was first described by William Barnes in 1928 and it is found in the United States from Massachusetts to Florida, west to Texas, north to Ohio.

The wingspan is 25–45 mm. Adults are on wing from May to October and from July to August in Ohio.

The larvae feed on the leaves of Pinus species.

External links

"Hypagyrtis esther (Esther Moth)". Mothguide. Archived from the original March 3, 2012.

Moths described in 1928
Boarmiini
Moths of North America